The Oybin is a hill in Saxony, southeastern Germany, near by the city of Zittau and it is part of the Zittau Mountains.

External links

Oybin Castle and Monastery
Mountain Church Oybin
Historical Monk Processions in Oybin

Mountains of Saxony
Rock formations of Saxony